Arteshbod Jafar Shafaghat (1915 – February 4, 2001) was a General officer in the Iranian Pahlavi Army and was the last Minister of Defense in Shapour Bakhtiar government (1978 — 1979). Jafar Shafaghat was the last governor of East Azerbaijan Province during the Pahlavi dynasty. He died in exile in Nice,  France.

Early life
Jafar Shafaghat was born in Tabriz in 1915. Coming from an Azerbaijani family. After graduating from primary and secondary school, with the help of his uncle Mohammad-Hossein Damavandi, he entered the Iranian College of Officers in 1933 (1312 Shamsi). After a two-year course, in the year 1935 (1314 Shamsi), he received the rank of officer. 

He later served in the Imperial guard, and ultimately was appointed commander of the shah's guard with the rank of captain. He served as the commander of the 1st Division of the Imperial Guard until 1950 with the rank of Colonel.

He attended L'École d'Application de l'Infanterie (EAI)pour officiers et sous-officiers, colocalisée avec l'ecole nationale des sous-officiers d'active (ENSOA), appelée communément Saint-Maixent in France and graduated 1953 (1332 Shamsi). He came back from France during the Mossadegh uprising and then went back a second time and graduated from École supérieure de guerre as part of the 70th group of graduates.

Military career 
One of his most important posts at that time was the command of the division in Urmia and the command of the Tabriz division. He was also the chief of staff of the army and deputy chief of staff until he was appointed commander of the 2nd Army. Later he became the Adjutant General of the Shah, until he was elected Deputy Chief of Staff of the General Staff of the Armed Forces. Jafar Shafaghat took several courses of command in France and the United States, and also received a doctorate in international law from the Sorbonne, and was also a military judge.

General Shafaghat took an active part in the reconstruction of the Iranian Imperial Guard in 1942, the strength of which was 700 volunteers. In 1946, he became commander of the "Immortal Guard", the elite imperial guard of the Shah. General Shafaghat attended the magnificent coronation of the Iranian monarch on October 26, 1967, where he personally handed over the “Pahlavi crown” to Shah Mohammad Reza Pahlavi.

Among his relatives in the army were: Brigadier General Khalil Shafaghat (sibling), Brigadier General Sattar Salimian, Major General Mahsud Hamapayi (division commander and last governor of the province of Kohgiluyeh and Boyer-Ahmad in 1978), Brigadier General Aziz Damavandi from the commanders of the Imperial Air Force) and Air Force Colonel Buick Damavandi.

Military Governor of East Azerbaijan (1978) 
On March 6, 1978, General Jafar Shafaghat was appointed governor of East Azerbaijan. This appointment followed the resignation of General Eskandar Azmoudeh, the former governor. Azmoudeh was fired on February 20 along with the head of the SAVAK branch in the province of East Azerbaijan and six policemen.

The Tabriz uprising of February 1978, which was directed against the Shah's government, was suppressed by police and army units, resulting in casualties among the demonstrators. A total of 14 people were killed and 125 injured. About 600-700 demonstrators were arrested, but soon released. These figures were confirmed in post-revolutionary investigations.

In turn, this uprising led to large-scale changes in the system, and these changes and the ensuing consequences soon led to the decline of the Pahlavi imperial system throughout Iran. The first major changes at the highest managerial levels occurred immediately after the formation of the “Tabriz Accident Investigation Board.” By order of the Shah, a top-level investigation team was sent to Tabriz, the head of which was appointed General Shafaghat. Due to the position of the members of this council and their high positions in the ruling bureaucratic apparatus, it seemed that there were significant changes in the levels of government in the province of East Azerbaijan. The Shah was so excited and worried about the events in Tabriz that he accused almost all officials of the province of East Azerbaijan who were involved in the events in Tabriz and promised to punish all those who could not prevent the bloodshed and take timely action. The first steps in this direction were the dismissal of 9 high-ranking officials of the province, among them: the governor, local police chiefs and some employees of SAVAK. On March 7, the Shah's leadership announced that several SAVAK officials and police would be punished for allowing unrest in February to get out of control. Governor General Eskandar Azmoudeh was removed from office and called to Tehran. Colonel Yahya Likwani, head of the SAVAK branch in the province of East Azerbaijan, was dismissed and temporarily removed from his post: but he soon again took a responsible post in the special services - Likvani became the head of the SAVAK branch in the province of Lurestan. But the least fortunate was Major General Kahramani, the provincial police chief. Immediately after the end of the meetings of the Investigative Commission in Tabriz, he was found guilty of the unrest and transferred to Tehran by decision of the council, and after that he never held high military and disciplinary posts.

Commentator Paul Hofmann's impressions of the Iranian public's opinion of their national intelligence agency, SAVAK, show that the Iranians were surprised that the government publicly criticized to the SAVAK branch in Tabriz.

The Shah also ordered the organization of a pro-Shah counter-demonstration to show support for the dynasty among the Azerbaijani population. It took the state apparatus six weeks to prepare a huge pro-government rally on April 9. According to some reports, the number of participants in this rally reached 300,000, which was confirmed by US reports.

At this rally, prime minister Jamshid Amouzegar delivered a speech. The opposition claimed that the government forcibly drove people from various neighboring villages, and regime agents spread false rumors in advance that the Grand Ayatollah Mohammad Kazem Shariatmadari would personally be present at the pro-Shah rally.

The victory of the Islamic Revolution in February 1979 
In early January 1979, the Shah appointed Shapour Bakhtiar to the post of prime minister, who began to search for a candidate for the post of Minister of War. Initially, the candidacy of General Fereydoun Djam was considered, but he refused. Then the choice fell on General Jafar Shafaghat, one of his closest assistants to the Shah and the former head of the Imperial Guard.

General Shafaghat was the only high-ranking officer of the Iranian Shah's army (out of 27 who were present at the Supreme Military Council of Iran) who refused to sign a document on the surrender of the army to the revolutionary forces in February 1979 and deleted his name from the list. This manifesto of the highest ranks of the army contributed to the easy victory of the Islamic Revolution.

After the fall of the Shah's power and the establishment of an Islamic regime, it was falsely reported that General Shafaghat was detained, but after a while he was released. However General Shafaghat was in hiding and never detained. Jafar Shafaghat fled to France in 1980.

Jafar Shafaghat died on February 4, 2001, in the southern French city of Nice, at the age of 85, where he was buried.

References 

2000 deaths
1910s births
People from Tabriz
Imperial Iranian Armed Forces four-star generals
Governors of East Azerbaijan Province
Defence ministers of Iran
Exiles of the Iranian Revolution in France
École Spéciale Militaire de Saint-Cyr alumni